Mpilo Central Hospital, more commonly known as Mpilo Hospital, is the largest hospital in Bulawayo, and second largest in Zimbabwe after  Parirenyatwa Hospital in Harare. Mpilo is a public hospital, and referral centre for the Matabeleland North, Matabeleland South and Midlands provinces of Zimbabwe.

The hospital's name, 'Mpilo' means 'life' in the native Ndebele language.

Mpilo has a School of Nursing as well as a School of Midwifery, both of which are located within the hospital campus.

See also 
 List of hospitals in Zimbabwe

References

External resources
 Ministry of Health and Child Welfare: https://web.archive.org/web/20120417102207/http://www.mohcw.gov.zw/index.php?option=com_content&view=article&id=61&Itemid=87
 Rasmussen, R.K., and Rubert, S.C., 1990. Historical Dictionary of Zimbabwe, Scarecrow Press.

Buildings and structures in Bulawayo
Hospitals in Zimbabwe
Medical education in Zimbabwe
Teaching hospitals
Hospitals established in 1958